Teryl Rothery is a Canadian actress of stage, television, and film.  She is best known for portraying Janet Fraiser in the TV series Stargate SG-1. She co-starred as Grace Sherman in Cedar Cove, and has had major roles as Muriel in Virgin River, Jean Loring in Arrow and Celia Hudson in Nancy Drew. She has been involved in a number of television movies.

Career

Rothery began dance lessons at age nine, and in 1995 looked upon that as the beginning of her career in entertainment.  Her first professional outings as a performer were in the musical Bye Bye Birdie at age 13 and in the Marpole Community Theatre's production of The Sound of Music at age 14.  As a youth, she danced on The Irish Rovers variety television series, and at age 18, she first appeared on television with a Canadian Broadcasting Corporation television special for Halloween.  From ages 19–27, Rothery switched to radio, variously working and performing for CJAZ-FM, KISS-FM, and CKWX.

For her performance in A Delicate Balance, Rothery was nominated for a Jessie Richardson Theatre Award (2006–2007) in the category of "Outstanding Performance by an Actress in a Supporting Role, Small Theatre".  In 2008, she was nominated for a Leo Award (in the category of "Best Performance by a Female in a Short Drama") for performing in Coffee Diva; she was nominated again in 2009 ("Best Supporting Performance by a Female in a Dramatic Series") for her work on The Guard.  Two more Leo nominations were for acting in The Collector, and portraying Janet Fraiser in Stargate SG-1.

Personal life
Rothery describes herself as a native of Vancouver, British Columbia, Canada, having been raised there by her grandparents. She has a daughter, Londyn (b. 2008).

Filmography

Live-action

Television

Television films

Feature films

Voice acting

Anime

Animation

Direct-to-video and television films

References

External links
 
 
 Teryl Rothery at Crystal Acids

20th-century Canadian actresses
21st-century Canadian actresses
Actresses from Vancouver
Canadian film actresses
Canadian stage actresses
Canadian television actresses

Living people
Year of birth missing (living people)